Spastic Ink was a progressive metal band from the United States.

History
Spastic Ink was formed in 1993 by guitarist Ron Jarzombek of Watchtower after recovering from multiple hand surgeries that had sidelined him, unable to play, for a couple of years. He would be joined by brother Bobby Jarzombek on drums and bass player Pete Perez (both of Riot at the time). The trio soon cut a demo consisting of 11 songs which was shopped to various labels in hopes of landing a record deal and the necessary funds to re-cut the material properly.  However, the band's all-instrumental highly complex progressive metal was deemed 'not commercially viable' and no deals were forthcoming.  Eventually, the band was able to secure a licensing agreement with German-based indie label Dream Circle Records for the release of the original demos, slightly cleaned up, 'as is'.  Ink Complete was finally released to rave reviews in 1997. Only months later, Dream Circle went bankrupt and the band lost out on several thousand dollars in royalties. Ron Jarzombek would re-issue the album on his own EclecticElectric label in 2000 with 25 minutes of 'work tapes' added as bonus material.

Work on a follow-up would prove tedious as Ron was forced to expand the original 3-piece line-up due to Bobby and Pete's commitments with Riot and Bobby joining Halford, the new band formed by former Judas Priest vocalist Rob Halford in 2000. Both Sean Reinert (Cynic, Gordian Knot) and Asgeir Mickelson (Spiral Architect) were set to perform drum tracks at certain times, but backed out due to conflicts with other projects. With the album in limbo, Ron Jarzombek turned his attention to doing a solo album, Solitarily Speaking of Theoretical Confinement, utilizing programmed drums and playing everything himself. Eventually, Ron would re-focus on Spastic Ink, with both Dave Penna and Jeff Eber of Dysrhythmia contributing drum tracks and brother Bobby cutting the rest of the tracks in between work with Halford. Jarzombek also got contributions from fellow guitarist Marty Friedman (ex-Megadeth), Pain of Salvation vocalist Daniel Gildenlöw, Watchtower bandmates Jason McMaster and Doug Keyser, bassists Pete Perez, Sean Malone (Cynic), Ray Riendeau (Halford, Machines of Loving Grace), and Michael Manring (Michael Hedges, Attention Deficit), as well as keyboardists Jens Johansson (Stratovarius), Jimmy Pitts (Scholomance, The Fractured Dimension), and David Bagsby. Ink Compatible was released in 2004 via Jarzombek's EclecticElectric label and Avalon/Marquee in Japan.

Musical style
Spastic Ink specialize in very complex instrumental fusion metal by using uncommon time signatures, frequent changes of time signatures and extremely unusual melodies. For example, the song "A Wild Hare" aurally recreates a scene from Bambi, even down to the dialogue, which is wordlessly mimicked by the guitar. This produces a very unusual sound that can come across as cacophonous, especially if the listener is unaware of the connection between the song and the cartoon.

Discography

Albums
Ink Complete (Dream Circle 1997), (EclecticElectric 2000)
Ink Compatible (ElectricElectric / Marquee/Avalon 2004)

External links
  Spastic Ink Facebook
  Spastic Ink ReverbNation page
  Spastic Ink MySpace
 Encyclopaedia Metallum page
  Ron Jarzombek online
 

American progressive metal musical groups
Musical groups established in 1993
Musical groups disestablished in 2004
Heavy metal musical groups from Texas
American musical trios
Sibling musical groups